

Original list
This is a list of Billboard magazine's Top Hot 100 songs of 1966. The Top 100, as revealed in the year-end edition of Billboard dated December 24, 1966, is based on Hot 100 charts from the issue dates of January 1 through December 10, 1966.

Later list
In later years, Billboard released another list of the top Hot 100 singles of 1966, which used a different methodology to compile the year-end list.

See also
1966 in music
List of Billboard Hot 100 number-one singles of 1966
List of Billboard Hot 100 top-ten singles in 1966

References

1966 record charts
Billboard charts